Uwe Raab (born 26 July 1962) is a German former professional cyclist born in Wittenberg, East Germany. He is most known for winning the Points classification in the 1990 and 1991  Vuelta a Españas. He also competed in the road race at the 1988 Summer Olympics.

Major results

1982
Troféu Joaquim Agostinho
1st Stages 3b, 5 & 6a
1st Prologue Tour de l'Avenir
1983
Peace Race
1st Stages 1, 6 & 9
1st Stage 4 Okolo Slovenska
1984
1st Stage 1 Peace Race
1985
1st Stage 12 Peace Race
1987
1st Stage 2 Peace Race
1989
Peace Race
1st Stages 5 & 8
1st Stage 3 Circuit Cycliste Sarthe
1st Prologue GP Tell
1990
Vuelta a España
1st  Points classification
1st Stages 10, 16 & 22
1st Stage 4 Volta a la Comunitat Valenciana
6th Overall Ronde van Nederland
9th Overall Tour of Sweden
1991
Vuelta a España
1st  Points classification
1st Stage 5
1st Stage 6 Vuelta a Aragón (ITT)
2nd Dwars door België
3rd E3 Harelbeke
8th Milan–San Remo
10th Overall KBC Driedaagse van De Panne-Koksijde
1992
1st Stage 1 Vuelta a Burgos
1st Stage 3 Settimana Internazionale di Coppi e Bartali
1st Stage 6 Vuelta a Asturias
1st Stage 1a Vuelta a los Valles Mineros
4th Milan–San Remo
6th Gent–Wevelgem
7th Overall KBC Driedaagse van De Panne-Koksijde
1993
1st Stage 6 Tirreno–Adriatico
8th Overall 4 Jours de Dunkerque
10th E3 Harelbeke

References

External links

 

1962 births
Living people
People from Wittenberg
East German male cyclists
German male cyclists
Cyclists from Saxony-Anhalt
Olympic cyclists of East Germany
Cyclists at the 1988 Summer Olympics
People from Bezirk Halle